Teddy Leifer (Edward Leifer) founded Rise Films in 2008 and has since produced or executive produced all of its films and television programmes including the 2013 Oscar nominee The Invisible War and 2018 Oscar winner Icarus.

In 2013 he won an Emmy for his work on The Interrupters, directed by Steve James, and in 2014 won a further two Emmys for his work on The Invisible War, directed by Kirby Dick. His other Producer and Executive Producer credits include We Are Together, Rough Aunties, Dreamcatcher, Who is Dayani Cristal?, and ITV2's multi award-winning Roman sitcom, Plebs, written by brother Sam Leifer. The show is the channel's highest rated comedy ever. In 2014, he won a Peabody Award and was nominated for a BAFTA. He is a member of the Producers Guild of America and BAFTA.

Teddy has produced films and television programmes for broadcasters and partners including BBC, Channel 4, ITV, Showtime, PBS, Hulu, Universal, Netflix, Film4 and HBO. Many of his productions have gone on to win at the Sundance Film Festival and other major international awards. He has been listed in the "100 most innovative and influential people in British creative and media industries" by the Guardian newspaper.

He is currently working with L.A.-based production company The Ink Factory on The American War, a spy drama depicting the fall of Saigon in 1975, which signalled the end of the Vietnam War. Tom Morton-Smith will write the screenplay, which is based on Decent Interval, the bestselling and controversial memoir by CIA operative-turned-whistleblower Frank Snepp, and his autobiography Irreparable Harm. In addition to this, it has recently been announced that Teddy and Rise will be co-producing a U.S. remake of Plebs with Seth Rogan's production company Point Grey Pictures.

Filmography
All That Breathes (2022) (producer)
The Art of Political Murder (2020) (producer)
Plebs (TV Series) (2018) (producer)
Icarus (2017) (executive producer)
The Love Commandos (2016) (TV) (executive producer)
Chancers (2016) (executive producer)
Dreamcatcher (2015) (producer)
Who is Dayani Cristal? (2013) (executive producer)
The Invisible War (2012) (executive producer)
Too Fast to be a Woman?: The Story of Caster Semenya (2011) (TV) (executive producer)
The Interrupters (2011) (executive producer)
Knuckle (2011) (producer)
The Honeymoon Suite (2010) (short) (producer)
Road To Las Vegas (2010) (TV) (producer)
Cowboys in India (2009) (producer)
Brave Young Men (2009) (TV) (producer)
Muslim School (2009) (TV) (executive producer)
Rough Aunties (2008) (producer)
Project Kashmir (2008) (associate producer)
We Are Together (Thina Simunye) (2006) (producer)
The 10th Man (2006) (short) (producer)
The Unsteady Chough (2004) (producer)

External links
 Official website
 Rise Foundation

References

British film producers
British television producers
Living people
1983 births
Primetime Emmy Award winners